Chief Theresa Laduntan Oyekanmi is the 14th Iyalode of Ibadan. She is a scion of the Ladapo family of Abebi Ibadan and the Ayeye Area's Balogun Ibikunle family.

Biography 
Laduntan Oyekanmi was born in Ibadan, Nigeria on October 3, 1933. In the 1960s, she studied nursing in England and married Prince 'Diti Oyekanmi of the royal Matanmi Family of Osogbo, Osun State, on August 12, 1961. She worked as a nurse at the University College Hospital in Ibadan until her retirement. Prince Oyekanmi, her husband, was a commissioner in the old Western region in the 1970s and served in the cabinet of former Military Governor of Oyo State, Major General David M. Jemibewon.

She became the Iyalode in July 2019, succeeding Aminat Abiodun.

Following the death of Oba Saliu Adetunji, the 41st Olubadan of Ibadan, she backed Senator Lekan Balogun, who was later crowned the 42nd Olubadan of Ibadan on 11 March 2022

References 

Nigerian traditional rulers
1933 births
Living people
Nigerian nurses
People from Ibadan
Women nurses